This is the complete list of number-one singles in Turkey in 2016 according to Radiomonitor. The list on the left side of the box (Resmi Liste, "the Official List") represents physical and digital track sales as well as music streaming of the Turkish artists, and the one on the right side (Yabancı Liste, "the Foreign List") represents the same thing for foreign artists.

Chart history

References

External links
 Official Twitter page of MusicTopTR
 Official Facebook page of MusicTop TR

Number-one songs
Turkish Top 20 Chart
2010s